Paul Robert Laine is a Canadian musician. He began his professional career as a solo artist, then was the singer of Danger Danger out of New York for eleven years, then fronted his own band, Shugaazer. Laine now has a band called "Darkhorse," whose album Let It Ride was released on April 29, 2014. He also teamed up with his former Danger Danger bandmates Bruno Ravel and Rob Marcello to form "The Defiants," who released their debut self-titled album on April 15, 2016.

Paul has teamed up with Lee Revill with the new band, Jet Set Junkies.

Discography

Solo albums
 Stick It in Your Ear (1990)
 Can't Get Enuff (1996)

with Danger Danger
 Dawn (1995)
 Four the Hard Way (1997)
 The Return of the Great Gildersleeves (2000)
 Cockroach (2001)
Live and Nude (2005)

with Shugaazer
 Shift (2004)

with Andersen-Laine-Readman
 III (2006)

with Darkhorse
 Let It Ride (2014)

with The Defiants
 The Defiants (2016)
 Zokusho (2019)
with Jet Set Junkies

 Self Titled (2022)

References

External links
Darkhorse Webpage

Canadian rock singers
Living people
Danger Danger members
Year of birth missing (living people)